This is a list of prominent people who were born in, lived in, or are otherwise closely associated with Washington, D.C., and its surrounding metropolitan area, which includes portions of Maryland and Virginia.

Actors

Gbenga Akinnagbe (born 1978), actor; born in D.C.
Jonathan Banks (born 1947), actor; born in D.C. 
Dave Bautista (born 1969), actor and former wrestler of the WWE; born in D.C.
Jon Bernthal (born 1976), actor; born in D.C.
David Birney (1939–2022), actor; born in D.C.
Blair Brown (born 1946), actress; born in D.C.
Billie Burke (1884–1970), actress; born in D.C.
Louis C.K.  (born 1967), actor, comedian; born in D.C.
Dave Chappelle (born 1973), actor, comedian; born in D.C.
Whitney Cummings (born 1982), comedian, actress; born in D.C.
Pat Flaherty (1897–1970), actor; born in D.C.
Matt Frewer (born 1958), actor; born in D.C.
Isabelle Fuhrman (born 1997); born in D.C.
Ana Gasteyer (born 1967), actress; born in D.C.
Cameron Goodman, actress; born in Texas; raised in D.C.
Regina Hall (born 1971), actress; born in D.C.
Alyson Hannigan (born 1974), actress; born in D.C.
Goldie Hawn (born 1945), actress; born in D.C.; raised in Takoma Park, Maryland
Helen Hayes (1900–1993), actress; born in D.C.
John Heard (1945–2017), actor; born in D.C.
Katherine Heigl (born 1978), actress; born in D.C.
Taraji P. Henson (born 1970), actress; born in D.C.
Edward Herrmann (1943–2014), actor; born in D.C.
William Hurt (1950–2022), actor; born in D.C.
Samuel L. Jackson (born 1948), actor; born in D.C.
Archie Kao (born 1973), actor; born in D.C.
Erik King, actor; born in D.C.
Michael Learned (born 1939), actress; born in D.C.
James McDaniel (born 1958), actor; born in D.C.
Christopher Meloni (born 1958), actor; born in D.C.
Bridgit Mendler (born 1992), singer and actress; born in D.C.
Michael Nouri (born 1958), actor; born in D.C.
Clifton Powell (born 1956), actor; born in D.C.
Madlyn Rhue (1935–2003), actress; born in D.C.
Chita Rivera (born 1933), Broadway musical actress; born in D.C.
Corey Parker Robinson (born 1975), actor; born in D.C.
Eden Riegel (born 1981), actress; born in D.C.
Yeardley Smith (born 1964), actress; born in Paris, France, raised in D.C.
 Josh Stamberg (born 1970), actor; born in D.C.
Ben Stein (born 1944), actor, author, economist, former political speechwriter; born in D.C.; raised in Maryland
Frances Sternhagen (born 1930), actress; raised in D.C.
Rip Taylor (1934–2019), actor, comedian; born in D.C.
Veronica Taylor (born 1965), actress; born in New York, raised in D.C.
Leigh Taylor-Young (born 1945), actress; born in D.C.
Justin Theroux (born 1971), actor; born in D.C.
Tony Todd (born 1954), actor; born in D.C.
Robin Weigert (born 1969), actress; born in D.C.
Samira Wiley (born 1987), actress; born in D.C.
Kellie Shanygne Williams (born 1976), actress; born in D.C.
Tom Williamson (born 1990), actor from The Fosters; born in D.C.
Robert Wisdom (born 1953), actor; born in D.C.
Jeffrey Wright (born 1965), Tony Award-winning stage and film actor; born in D.C.
Leonard Wu (born 1986), actor; born in D.C.
Damian Young (born 1961), actor; born in D.C.
Rick Yune (born 1971), actor; born in D.C.

Artists
Richard Artschwager (1923–2013); Minimalist and Pop artist; born in D.C.
Robin Bell (born 1979); art projectionist; lives and works in D.C.
Ned Bittinger (born 1951); portrait painter and illustrator; born in D.C.
F. Lennox Campello (born 1956); visual artist, critic and author; works in D.C.
Allen 'Big Al' Carter (1947–2008); painter; worked and taught art in D.C.
Elizabeth Catlett (1915–2012); sculptor; born in D.C.
Will H. Chandlee (1865–1955); painter and illustrator; born in D.C.
Shanthi Chandrasekar, painter and sculptor; works out of D.C.
Manon Cleary (1942–2011), painter and educator; lived in D.C.
Rosetta DeBerardinis, visual artist; lives in D.C.
Gene Davis (1920–1985); painter; born in D.C.
Victor Ekpuk (born 1964), visual artist; lives in D.C.
Joseph Craig English, printmaker; born in Washington, D.C.
Inez Demonet, (1897–1980), visual artist; born in Washington, D.C.
Catriona Fraser (born 1972), photographer and art dealer; worked in Washington, DC
Sam Gilliam (1933–2022); painter; lives in D.C.
Nan Goldin (born 1953); photographer; born in D.C.
Patricia Goslee; painter, lives in Washington, D.C.
Michael Janis (born 1959); glass artist; lives in D.C.
Mark Jenkins (born 1970) street artist; lives in D.C.
Wayson R. Jones, visual artist; works in D.C.
Eugene J. Martin (1938–2005), visual artist; born in D.C.
Nate Lewis, visual artist; works out of D.C.
Morris Louis (1912–1962), painter; lived in D.C.
Kevin MacDonald (1947–2006), painter; lived in D.C.
Percy Martin, visual artist; lives in D.C.
Benoit Maubrey (born 1952), born in D.C.
Alexa Meade (born 1986), visual artist; born in D.C.
Michael B. Platt (1948–2019), visual artist and art professor; lived and worked in D.C.
Judith Peck, visual artist, works in D.C.
Martin Puryear (born 1941), sculptor; born in D.C.
Amber Robles-Gordon, mixed media artist; lives in D.C.
Paul Reed (1919–2015), painter; born in D.C.
Joe Shannon (born 1937), painter and educator; worked in D.C.
Lou Stovall (born 1937), printmaker; lives in D.C.
Tim Tate (born 1960), glass and video artist; born in D.C.
Erwin Timmers (born 1964), glass artist; lives in D.C.
Bill Watterson (born 1958), cartoonist; born in D.C.
Frances Wieser (1869–1949), scientific illustrator; born and died in D.C.
Frank Wright (1932–2020), painter; born in D.C.

Athletes

Kevyn Adams (born 1974), hockey player; born in D.C.
Jake Atz (1879–1945), baseball player; born in D.C.
Elgin Baylor (1934–2021), basketball player; born in D.C.
Walter Beall (1899–1959), former baseball player; born in D.C.
Lu Blue (1897–1958), baseball player; born in D.C.
Jerry Chambers (born 1943), former basketball player; born in D.C.
Patrick Clark (born 1995), professional wrestler; born in D.C.
 Bonzie Colson (born 1996), basketball player in the Israeli Basketball Premier League; born in D.C.
Derek Cooke (born 1991), basketball player; born in D.C.
Josh Cribbs (born 1983), football player; born in D.C.
Adrian Dantley (born 1956), former basketball player; born in D.C.
Vernon Davis (born 1984), football player; born in D.C.
Vontae Davis (born 1988), football player; born in D.C.
Kevin Durant (born 1988), basketball player; born in D.C.
Malik Ellison (born 1996), basketball player; born in D.C.
Lennard Freeman (born 1995), basketball player; born in D.C. 
Frank Funk (born 1935), former baseball player; born in D.C.
A. J. Francis (born 1990), football player and wrestler; born in D.C.
Luka Garza (born 1998), basketball player; born in D.C.
Paul Goldstein (born 1976), tennis player; born in D.C. 
Frank Jackson (born 1998), basketball player; born in D.C.
Clay Kirby (1948–1991), baseball player; born in D.C.
Katie Ledecky (born 1997), Olympic swimmer; born in D.C.
Byron Leftwich (born 1980), football player; born in D.C.
Tim Legler (born 1966), former basketball player; born in D.C.
Andrew Luck (born 1989), football quarterback; born in D.C.
Shawne Merriman (born 1984), football player; born in D.C.
Matt Mervis (born 1998), baseball player; born in D.C.
Rollie Miles (1927–1995), Canadian football player; born in D.C.
Don Money (born 1947), baseball player; born in D.C.
Robin Montgomery (born 2004), tennis player; born in D.C.
Josh Morgan (born 1985), football player; born in D.C.
Jon Morris (born 1942), football player; born in D.C.
Bubba Morton (1931–2006), baseball player; born in D.C.
Jonathan Ogden (born 1974), football player; born in D.C.
Jamorko Pickett (born 1997), basketball player; born in D.C.
Jerry Porter (born 1978), former football player; born in D.C.
Curtis Pride (born 1968), former baseball player; born in D.C.
Pete Sampras (born 1971), tennis player; born in D.C.
Harold Solomon (born 1952), former tennis player; born in D.C.
Teez Tabor (born 1995), cornerback for the Atlanta Falcons; born in D.C.
James Tillman (1919–2009), Negro league baseball player; born in D.C.
Michael Weiss (born 1976), figure skater; born in D.C.
Delonte West (born 1983), basketball player; born in D.C.
Brian Westbrook (born 1979), football player; born in D.C.
Mike Wilcher (born 1960), former football player; born in D.C.
Maury Wills (1932–2022), former baseball player; born in D.C.
Willie Wood (1936–2020), football player; born in D.C.

Entertainment 

Pat Buchanan (born 1938), author, syndicated columnist, television commentator; born in D.C.
Connie Chung (born 1946), television journalist; born in D.C.
Stephen Colbert (born 1964), television host, comedian; born in D.C.
Sarah Urist Green (born 1979), PBS art program creator and former museum curator; born in D.C.
Petey Greene (1931–1984), radio and TV talk show host; born in D.C.
Tim Gunn (born 1953), TV personality and fashion expert; born in D.C.
Jim Henson (1936–1990), creator of the Muppets; lived in D.C. from 1948 until 1961.
Fulton Lewis (1903–1966), radio and TV commentator; born in D.C.
Patricia Newcomb (born 1930), American producer and publicist; born in D.C.
Bill Nye ("Bill Nye the Science Guy") (born 1955), television host, scientist, mechanical engineer; born in D.C.
Maury Povich (born 1939), television talk show host; born in D.C.
Diane Rehm (born 1936), radio talk show host; born in D.C.
Scott Sanders (born 1968), screenwriter and director, born in N.C., raised in D.C.

Journalists

Jim Acosta (born 1971), journalist born in D.C.
Thomas Boswell (born 1947), journalist born in D.C.
John Dickerson (born 1968), journalist; born in D.C.
Susan Ford (born 1957), photojournalist and chairman of the Betty Ford Center; born in D.C.
David Frum (born 1960), journalist, currently newspaper writer of The Atlantic
Douglas Harriman Kennedy (born 1967), journalist born in D.C.
Austin H. Kiplinger (1918–2015), journalist and philanthropist; born in D.C.
Buster Olney (born 1964); sports columnist; born in D.C.
Frank Rich (born 1949), newspaper columnist; born in D.C.
David Simon (born 1960), author, journalist; born in D.C.
A. G. Sulzberger (born 1980), journalist; born in D.C.
Cal Thomas (born 1942), newspaper columnist and author; born in D.C.

Military

 Frederic Vaughan Abbot (1858–1928), U.S. Army brigadier general, resided in D.C. during retirement
 Alfred E. Bates (1840–1909), U.S. Army major general, lived in D.C. during retirement
 George S. Blanchard (1920–2006), U.S. Army four-star general; born in D.C.
 William Bryden  (1880–1972), U.S. Army major general, lived in Washington, D.C. during retirement
 John Loomis Chamberlain (1858–1948), U.S. Army major general, retired in Washington, D.C.
 John M. K. Davis (1844–1920), U.S. Army brigadier general; born in D.C.
 Lester A. Dessez (1896–1981), U.S. Marine Corps brigadier general; born in Arlington, VA, raised in D.C.
 Lorenzo D. Gasser (1876–1955), U.S. Army general, retired to Washington, D.C.
 Cecil D. Haney (born 1955), U.S. Navy admiral who commanded U.S. Strategic Command; born in D.C.
 George Herbert Harries (1860–1934), U.S. Army major general, resided in Washington, D.C.
 Charles L. Hodges (1847–1911), U.S. Army major general, retired in Washington, D.C.
 Martin P. Hottel (1904–1981), U.S. Navy Admiral and decorated submarine commander; born in D.C.
Beverley Kennon (1793–1844), commodore in the United States Navy and commander of the Bureau of Construction and Repair; resided in Washington
 Lester Lyles (born 1946), former U.S. Air Air Force general, Vice Chief of Staff of the United States Air Force, and Commander, Air Force Materiel Command
 Anthony McAuliffe (1898–1975), U.S. Army General, commander of the 101st Airborne Division defending Bastogne; born in D.C.
 Edward C. Peter II (1929 – 2008), U.S. Army lieutenant general, commander of Fourth United States Army; born in D.C.
 Curtis C. Robinson (1919–2009), pharmacist, U.S. Army Air Force officer, fighter pilot with the Tuskegee Airmen; lived and died in D.C.
Daniel H. Rucker (1812–1910), U.S. Army brigadier general, resided in Washington, D.C. during his retirement
Joseph P. Sanger (1840–1926), U.S. Army major general
Charles G. Sawtelle (1834–1913), U.S. Army brigadier general, resided in Washington, D.C. during retirement
William Renwick Smedberg Jr. (1871–1942), U.S. Army brigadier general; lived in D.C. in retirement; died in D.C.
Franklin Guest Smith (1840–1912), U.S. Army brigadier general, resident of Washington, D.C. during his retirement
Oliver Lyman Spaulding (1875–1947), U.S. Army brigadier general, 1891 graduate of  Central High School, lived in Washington during retirement
Karl Truesdell (1882–1955), U.S. Army major general, raised in D.C.
 Carlos Clark Van Leer (1865–1953), U.S. Army Captain and Chief of Personnel and Budget for Department of Treasury: lived and died in D.C.
 Earle Wheeler (1908–1975), U.S. Army general; born in D.C.
 Eben Eveleth Winslow (1866–1928), U.S. Army brigadier general; raised and educated in D.C.
 John E. Woodward (1870–1944), U.S. Army brigadier general, lived in D.C. during retirement

Musicians

Chuck Brown (1936–2012), musician; lived in D.C.
Tim Buckley (1947–1975), musician; born in D.C.
Vernon Burch (born 1955), singer; born in D.C.
Jack Casady (born 1944), musician (Jefferson Airplane, Hot Tuna); born in D.C.
Eva Cassidy (1963–1996), singer; born in D.C.
Clones of Clones, indie-rock band; originated in D.C.
Chris Cutler, (born 1947), musician (Henry Cow, Art Bears); born in D.C.
DJ Kool (born 1958), rapper; born in D.C.
Duke Ellington (1899–1974), jazz composer, pianist and bandleader; born in D.C.
John Fahey (1939–2001), musician; born in D.C.
Marty Friedman (born 1962), musician; born in D.C.
Danny Gatton (1945–1994), musician; born in D.C.
Marvin Gaye (1939–1984), singer; born in D.C.
Johnny Gill (born 1966), singer; born in D.C.
Ginuwine (born 1970), singer; born in D.C.
Goldlink (born 1993), rapper; born in D.C.
Dave Grohl (born 1969), musician (Nirvana, Foo Fighters); began career as drummer for D.C.-area bands
Ron Holloway (born 1953), musician; (Dizzy Gillespie, Susan Tedeschi, Gil Scott-Heron); born in D.C.
Shirley Horn (1934–2005), singer; born in D.C.
Lida Husik (born 1963), musician; born in D.C.
Darryl Jenifer (born 1960), musician; born in D.C.
Al Jolson (1886–1950), singer; born in Seredžius, Lithuania; raised in D.C.
Jorma Kaukonen (born 1940), musician (Jefferson Airplane, Hot Tuna); born in D.C.
Damian Kulash (born 1975), musician (OK Go); born in D.C.
Stacy Lattisaw (born 1966), singer; born in D.C.
Ari Lennox (born 1991), singer; born in D.C
Ian MacKaye (born 1962) musician (Minor Threat, Fugazi); born in D.C.
Van McCoy (1940–1979), musician, songwriter and producer; born in D.C.
Mýa (born 1979), singer; born in D.C.
Nonchalant (born 1970), rapper; born in D.C.
Oddisee (born 1985), rapper; born in D.C.
Guy Picciotto, (born 1965), musician (Rites of Spring, Fugazi); born in D.C.
James Ray, (1941–1963), singer; born in D.C.
Henry Rollins (born 1961), singer-songwriter (Black Flag, Rollins Band); born in D.C.
Tim Rose (1940–2002), singer-songwriter; born in D.C.
Hayley Sales, pop singer; born in D.C.
Shy Glizzy (born 1992), rapper; born in D.C.
Richard Smallwood, (born 1948), Grammy award-winning Gospel singer-songwriter; born in Atlanta and raised in D.C.
Kate Smith (1907–1986), singer; born in D.C.
Rob Sonic, rapper; born in D.C.
John Philip Sousa (1854–1932), composer; born in D.C.
Billy Stewart (1937–1970), singer; born in D.C.
Mary Timony (born 1970); musician; born in D.C.
Peter Tork (1942–2019), musician; born in D.C.
Wale (born 1984), rapper; born in D.C.
Wax (born 1980), rapper; born in D.C.

Political figures

Kenneth Bacon (1944–2009), Department of Defense spokesman; later served as president of Refugees International
Cory Booker (born 1969), U.S. Senator from New Jersey; born in D.C.
Muriel Bowser (born 1972), Mayor of Washington D.C.
Jean Carnahan, former U.S. Senator from Missouri, born and raised in D.C.
Mel Carnahan, former governor of Missouri, raised in D.C.
 Pedro Casanave (c. 1766 – 1796), fifth mayor of Georgetown in Washington, D.C.
Dereck E. Davis (born 1967), Treasurer of Maryland; born in D.C.
John Foster Dulles (1888–1959), U.S. Secretary of State; born in D.C.
Adrian Fenty (born 1970), mayor of the District of Columbia, 2007–2011; born in D.C.
Al Gore (born 1948), U.S. vice president; born in D.C.
Tipper Gore (born 1948), wife of former vice president Al Gore; born in D.C.
Larry Hogan (born 1956), governor of Maryland; born in D.C.
Sharon Pratt Kelly (born 1944), mayor of the District of Columbia, 1991–1995; born in D.C.
Ned Lamont (born 1954), businessman and 89th Governor of Connecticut; born in D.C.
Brian Sims (born 1978), Democratic member of the Pennsylvania House of Representatives; born in D.C.
Gladys Spellman (1918–1988), former member of the U.S. House Of Representatives from Maryland; raised in New York and D.C.
Conrad Tillard (born 1964), politician, Baptist minister, radio host, author, and activist
Walter Nathan Tobriner (1902–1979), Washington, D.C., government official; born in D.C.
Larry Warner (1943–2022), Texas state legislator; born in D.C.
Paul Wellstone (1944–2002), U.S. Senator from Minnesota; born in D.C.

Scientists 
 Charles R. Drew (1904–1950), physician, medical researcher; born in D.C.
 Danielle Hairston, psychiatrist; educated in D.C.
 Michael Hendricks, psychologist, suicidologist, and advocate for the LGBT community; long-time resident of D.C.
 Lars Krutak, tattoo anthropologist; long-time resident of D.C.

Writers
Edward Albee (1928–2016), playwright; born in D.C.
Alida Anderson (born 1969), Arts researcher, author and professor at American University; born in D.C.
Ann Beattie (born 1947), short story writer and novelist; born in D.C.
Tracy Chevalier (born 1962), novelist; born in D.C.
Ella Loraine Dorsey (1853–1935), author, journalist, translator; born in D.C.
Jonathan Safran Foer (born 1977), writer; born in D.C.
Mary Downing Hahn (born 1937), author; born in D.C.
Edward P. Jones (born 1951), author; raised in D.C.
George Pelecanos (born 1957), author of detective fiction; born in D.C.
Marjorie Kinnan Rawlings (1896–1953), writer; born in D.C.
David Simon (born 1960), screenwriter; born in D.C.
Paula Vogel (born 1951), playwright; born in D.C.

Miscellaneous

Vanilla Beane (1919–2022), Black milliner and business woman; moved to D.C. in the 1940s
Blac Chyna (born 1988), American socialite and model; born and raised in D.C.
Ruby Corado (born 1970), transgender activist, founder and executive director of Casa Ruby in D.C.; married in D.C.
Julie Nixon Eisenhower (born 1948), daughter of President Richard Nixon; born in D.C.
Andrew Fastow (born 1961), chief financial officer of Enron Corporation; born in D.C.
Albert Fish (1870–1936), cannibalistic serial killer and rapist; born in D.C
Bill France Sr. (1909–1992), founder and CEO of NASCAR; born in D.C.
Bill France Jr. (1933–2007), CEO of NASCAR; born in D.C.
Steven B. Gould (born 1966), American lawyer and judge from Maryland; born in D.C.
Shauntay Hinton, Miss USA 2002, Miss District of Columbia 2002; educated in D.C.
J. Edgar Hoover (1895–1972), FBI director; born in D.C.
Charlene Drew Jarvis (born 1941), educator and president of Southeastern University; born in D.C.
Kerry Kennedy (born 1959), human rights advocate; born in D.C.
Robert F. Kennedy Jr. (born 1954), environmental lawyer and radio talk host; born in D.C.
Bruce Levenson (born 1949), businessman, philanthropist, and former owner of the Atlanta Hawks; born in D.C.
J.W. Marriott Jr. (born 1932), chairman and CEO of Marriott International; born in D.C.
Clarence Moore (1865–1912), businessman; D.C. resident from 1890
Queen Noor of Jordan (born 1951); born in D.C.
Perry Redd (born 1964), social activist and organizer, and songwriter; born in D.C.
Tony Ressler (born 1960), billionaire and owner of the Atlanta Hawks; born in D.C.

References

 
 

ro:Listă de oameni din Washington, D.C., SUA